Kębłowo may refer to the following places:
Kębłowo, Wolsztyn County in Greater Poland Voivodeship (west-central Poland)
Kębłowo, Września County in Greater Poland Voivodeship (west-central Poland)
Kębłowo, Pomeranian Voivodeship (north Poland)